Elekmonar (Elikmanar) is a rural locality (a selo) and the administrative centre of Elekmonarskoye Rural Settlement of Chemalsky District, the Altai Republic, Russia. The population was 1895 as of 2016. There are 5 streets.

Geography 
Elekmonar is located on northeast of Altai Mountains at the confluence of the Elekmonar River in the Katun River, 6 km north of Chemal (the district's administrative centre) by road. Chemal is the nearest rural locality.

References 

Rural localities in Chemalsky District